Dorsey Knob is a mountain summit located off U.S. Route 119 at the southern edge of Morgantown in Monongalia County, West Virginia, United States. Dorsey Knob is contained within a park spanning 71 acres (29 ha) that features the mountain's landmark Sky Rock (also referred to as Dorsey Knob). It overlooks the Monongahela River and the Appalachian Mountains. Also located in the park is Dorsey's Knob Lodge, operated by Boparc, Morgantown's municipal park authority.

References

External link

Mountains of West Virginia
Landforms of Monongalia County, West Virginia